II is the second studio album by the Spanish heavy metal band Darna, released in December 2003.

Track listing
 Tras el disfraz
 Sueños rotos
 Entre sueño y realidad
 En venta
 Realidad virtual
 Cómo elegir un culpable
 Héroes de ciudad
 Sangre de Rock & Roll
 ¿Dónde estás?

2003 albums
Darna (band) albums